Millar is a surname. Notable people with the surname include:

Alan Millar (born 1947), former Head of Philosophy at the University of Stirling
Alex Millar (born 1985), British professional poker player
Andrew Millar (1707–1768), British publisher and bookseller
Bill Millar, English soccer player
Blair Millar (born 1956), Scottish footballer
Brian Millar (born 1966), Irish cricketer
Charles Vance Millar (1853–1926), Canadian lawyer and financier
Chris Millar (born 1983), Scottish footballer
Craig Millar (ice hockey) (born 1977), Canadian former professional hockey player
Darren Millar (born 1976), Welsh politician
Dave Millar (born 1945), Scottish footballer
David Millar (born 1977), Scottish road racing cyclist
Duncan Millar (1824–1881), Scottish recipient of the Victoria Cross
Fergus Millar, British historian
Frederick Millar, 1st Baron Inchyra (1900–1989), British diplomat
Gavin Millar (born 1938), Scottish film director
Geoff Millar (born 1955), Australian cricketer
Gertie Millar (1879–1952), English singer and actress
George Millar (writer), journalist, British World War II soldier, SOE agent, writer
Harold Robert Millar (1869–1940) a Scottish graphic artist and illustrator
Huntly D. Millar (born 1927), founder of Millar Instruments, Inc.
Ian Millar (born 1947), Canadian show jumper
James D. Millar (1869-1948), American politician
James Millar (educationalist)
John Millar (1735–1801), Scottish philosopher and historian
John A. Millar (1855–1915), New Zealand politician
Joseph Millar, American poet
Judy Millar (born 1957), New Zealand artist
Kevin Millar (born 1971), American baseball player
Liam Millar (born 1999), Canadian professional soccer player
Maggie Millar (born 1941) Australian actress
Marc Millar (born 1969), Scottish footballer
Margaret Millar (1915–1994), American-Canadian mystery and suspense writer
Mark Millar (born 1969), Scottish comic book writer
Mark Millar (footballer) (born 1988), Scottish footballer
Mary Millar (1936–1998), English actress
Martin Millar (writer), Scottish author
Mike Millar (born 1965), Canadian hockey player
Miles Millar (b 1970), British screenwriter and producer
Oliver Millar (1923–2007), British art historian
Paul Millar (disambiguation)
Peter Millar (journalist), British journalist and author
Peter Millar (soccer), former American Soccer player
Renton Millar (born 1975), Australian professional vertical skateboarder
Robbie Millar (1967–2005), Northern Irish chef and restaurateur
Robert Millar (born 1958), former Scottish professional cyclist
Robin Millar (born 1951), English musician, songwriter, and record producer
Rodrigo Millar (born 1981), Chilean footballer
Ron Millar, video game designer
Ryan Millar (born 1978), American volleyball player
Sandy Millar (born 1939), English Anglican bishop
Syd Millar (born 1934), chairman of the International Rugby Board
Thomas Millar (1925–1994), Australian historian and political scientist
Willie Millar (1901–1966), Scottish professional footballer

Fictional characters:
Alex Millar (Being Human), a lead character in the British television series Being Human
Kirsty Millar, a character from the British soap opera Doctors
Rich Millar, a character from the British soap opera Doctors
Ollie Millar, a character from the British soap opera Doctors

See also
Millar Addition, suburb of Prince George, British Columbia, Canada
Mount Millar Wind Farm
Miller (disambiguation)
Miller (name)
List of people with surname Miller

English-language surnames